Pictures of Moments to Remember is the fifth studio album by The Statler Brothers and the second one recorded for Mercury Records. Two of the songs from the album, "You Can't Go Home" and "Pictures" were released as singles.

Track listing
 "Pictures"
 "Second Thoughts"
 "Tender Years" (Darrell Edwards)
 "Faded Love" (Bob Wills, John Wills)
 "Makin' Memories"
 "Things"
 "You Can't Go Home"
 "When You and I Were Young, Maggie" (Traditional)
 "Just Someone I Used to Know"
 "I Wonder How the Old Folks Are at Home"
 "Moments to Remember" (Robert Allen, Al Stillman)

Personnel
Chip Young, Harold Bradley, Jerry Kennedy, Ray Edenton – guitar
Pete Drake – steel guitar
Jerry Kennedy – dobro
Earl Scruggs – banjo
Bob Moore – bass
Charlie McCoy – organ, vibraphone, harmonica
Floyd Cramer – piano
Buddy Harman – drums
Cam Mullins – arrangements

References

Further reading

External links
 Statler Discography

1971 albums
Mercury Records albums
Albums produced by Jerry Kennedy
The Statler Brothers albums